Chetwoot Lake is a freshwater lake located on the western slope of Iron Cap Mountain next to Crawford Lake, in King County, Washington. West Fork Foss River exits Chetwoot Lake towards Angeline Lake and then to a canyon that produces Angeline Falls downstream towards Delta Lake. Because Chetwoot Lake is at the heart of the Alpine Lakes Wilderness, the lake is a popular area for hiking, swimming, and fishing.

Chetwoot is a compound word from the Chinook Jargon chet’-woot or its’woot meaning black bear or grizzly.

Geography
Chetwoot Lake is nestled in a long structural benchland with relatively level or gently inclined land bounded by the distinctly steeper slopes of Tourmaline Peak on the northwest shore of the lake and Atrium Peak above and between Angeline and Big Heart Lake. The host rock in this area is greensand from the Lopingian epoch 260 to 250 million years ago.

Climate
Chetwoot Lake is within a hemiboreal climate. The average temperature is 0° C. The warmest month is August, with an average temperature of 13° C, and the coldest month is January, at an average of −10 ° C. The average rainfall is 2,989 millimeters per year. The wettest month is January, with 396 millimeters of rain, and the least in July, with 38 millimeters of rain.

Access
Access to Chetwoot Lake is through West Fork Foss Lakes Trail #1064 off  Forest Service road 6835 a side road of Foss River Road (Forest Service Road #68), which exits US Highway 2. The trail borders Trout Lake, Lake Malachite, Copper lake and Little Heart Lake before ending on campsites along Atrium Peak, the ridge between Big Heart Lake and Angeline Lake to the East. Self-issued Alpine Lake Wilderness permit required for transit within the Necklace Valley area.

See also 
 List of lakes of the Alpine Lakes Wilderness
 Waterfalls of the West Fork Foss River Valley

References 

Lakes of King County, Washington
Lakes of the Alpine Lakes Wilderness
Okanogan National Forest